Makhdoom Syed Iftikhar Hassan Gillani is a Pakistani politician who was a Member of the Provincial Assembly of the Punjab, from May 2013 to May 2018 and from August 2018 to January 2023.

Early life and education
He was born on 23 December 1958 in Bahawalpur.

He graduated from The Islamia University of Bahawalpur in 1979.

Political career

He was elected to the Provincial Assembly of the Punjab as a candidate of Bahawalpur National Awami Party from Constituency PP-267 (Bahawalpur-I) in 2013 Pakistani general election.

He was re-elected to Provincial Assembly of the Punjab as a candidate of Pakistan Tehreek-e-Insaf from Constituency PP-254 (Bahawalpur-X) in 2018 Pakistani general election.

References

1958 births
Living people
Saraiki people
Punjab MPAs 2013–2018
Punjab MPAs 2018–2023
Pakistan Tehreek-e-Insaf MPAs (Punjab)
Pakistan Tehreek-e-Insaf politicians